In algebra, a generic matrix ring is a sort of a universal matrix ring.

Definition 
We denote by  a generic matrix ring of size n with variables . It is characterized by the universal property: given a commutative ring R and n-by-n matrices  over R, any mapping  extends to the ring homomorphism (called evaluation) .

Explicitly, given a field k, it is the subalgebra  of the matrix ring  generated by n-by-n matrices , where  are matrix entries and commute by definition. For example, if m = 1 then  is a polynomial ring in one variable.

For example, a central polynomial is an element of the ring  that will map to a central element under an evaluation. (In fact, it is in the invariant ring  since it is central and invariant.)

Geometric perspective 
This has a following geometric meaning. The free ring  plays the role of the coordinate ring of the affine space in the noncommutative algebraic geometry (i.e., we don't demand free variables to commute) and thus a generic matrix ring of size n is the coordinate ring of a noncommutative affine variety whose points are the Spec's of matrix rings of size n (see below for a more concrete discussion.)

The maximal spectrum of a generic matrix ring 

For simplicity, assume k is algebraically closed. Let A be an algebra over k and let  denote the set of all maximal ideals  in A such that .

References 

 

Algebraic structures